Arindzh or Aryndzh may refer to:
 Arinj, Armenia
 Arınc, Azerbaijan